The  was held on 6 February 2005 in Kannai Hall, Yokohama, Kanagawa, Japan.

Awards
 Best Film: Kamikaze Girls
 Best Actor: Kōji Yakusho – Yudan Taiteki, Tōkyō Genpatsu, Warai no Daigaku: University of Laughs
 Best Actress: Kyōko Fukada – Kamikaze Girls
 Best Supporting Actor: Akira Emoto – Yudan Taiteki, Niwatori wa Hadashida
 Best Supporting Actress: Kirin Kiki – Kamikaze Girls, Half a Confession, Hotaru no Hoshi Best Director: Tetsuya Nakashima – Kamikaze Girls Best New Director: Izuru Narushima – Yudan Taiteki Best Screenplay: Shinobu Yaguchi – Swing Girls Best Cinematography: Takahide Shibanushi – Swing Girls, Shinkokyū no Hitsuyō, Gege Best New Talent:
Yūya Yagira – Nobody KnowsAnna Tsuchiya – Kamikaze Girls, The Taste of TeaJuri Ueno – Swing Girls, Josee, the Tiger and the Fish, Chirusoku no Natsu Special Prize: Kazuo Kuroki – Utsukushii Natsu Kirishima, Chichi to KurasebaBest 10
 Kamikaze Girls Blood and Bones Nobody Knows Swing Girls Josee, the Tiger and the Fish The Face of Jizo Yudan Taiteki The Golden Cups One More Time Shinkokyū no Hitsuyō Hana and Alicerunner-up. Niwatori wa Hadashida''

References

Yokohama Film Festival
Y
Y
2005 in Japanese cinema
February 2005 events in Japan